Jason Jeffrey Gay  (born January 18, 1972), better known by his stage name Jason Gray, is an American contemporary Christian singer-songwriter. He was born Jason Jeffrey Gay and released a number of albums independently under his given name. Gay legally changed his last name to Gray in 2006, citing issues associated with internet search engines and content filters when fans would search for “Jason Gay.” In 2007 he signed to Centricity Music releasing more albums with them under the name Jason Gray.

Career
He was born and raised in Southwestern Minnesota where he spent six years in youth ministry, before going into full-time music ministry in 1999 as an independent artist. He lived in the Mankato area until his move to Nashville in 2015. Gray has a speech disorder, as a person who stutters, his work emphasizes finding strength in weakness. He released four independent records before signing with Centricity Music in 2006. Centricity released his first major label record, "All the Lovely Losers" in 2007. ChristianityToday.com calls Gray one of "Christian music's best kept secrets."

Gray has collaborated with artists such as Sara Groves, Andrew Peterson, Joel Hanson (frontman for 90s Christian rock band PFR), Andy Gullahorn, Randall Goodgame, Jason Ingram, Thad Cockrell, Andy Osenga (of Caedmon's Call) and others. He has toured with Jeremy Camp, Sanctus Real, Matthew West, Shawn McDonald, downhere, Big Daddy Weave, The Afters, Mark Schultz and others.

Gray has won several ASCAP Performance Awards for "More Like Falling in Love" (2011) and "Good to Be Alive" (2012). He has shared the stage with many major artists such as Michael W. Smith, Steven Curtis Chapman, Lauren Daigle and Sanctus Real. His first No. 1 single, "Nothing Is Wasted", reached the top spot on the Soft AC Chart in May 2013 and remained there for nine weeks.

His release in 2012, was named Album of the Year by critics and garnered three Top 5 radio singles which included the "Nothing Is Wasted" single. Also in May 2013, he was honored at ASCAP's 35th Annual Christian Music Awards with the "Most Performed Song Award" for his song "Good to Be Alive" co-written with Brandon Heath and Jason Ingram. The song was a Top 5 single on Christian radio and was released on Gray's album A Way to See in the Dark.

On March 4, 2014, Gray released the album Love Will Have the Final Word, which speaks to the redeeming power of unfailing love, decisiveness, and closure. The lead single, "With Every Act of Love", helped mark the most successful launch at radio in Centricity Music history at that time with 39 adds its debut week reached Billboards Top Ten AC Indicator chart and Top 20 on the National Audience Chart and was a No.1 radio hit. In March 2014, Gray embarked on the K-LOVE Listener Appreciate Tour in support of his newest album.

On March 20, 2014, Gray joined The Bible: Son of God 2014 Tour along with artists such as Natalie Grant, Francesca Battistelli, Sidewalk Prophets, Chris August and Meredith Andrews.  In February 2015, Gray went on the spring leg of the Beautiful Offerings Tour with Big Daddy Weave along with Citizen Way and Lauren Daigle.

His release, Love Will Have the Final Word: Post Script, was released June 9, 2015. It features remixes, over-cuts and demos from the previous album Love Will Have the Final Word and the new songs "Glow in the Dark" and "One Voice". Charisma magazine says, "Jason Gray has emerged as a songwriter of extraordinary depth, with a noteworthy ability to convey deep theological truths." His subsequent studio album, Where the Light Gets In, was released on June 17, 2016, with Centricity Music.

He released The Kipper Gray Sessions EP in 2018; a collaboration between him and his son Kristopher "Kipper" Gray who produced and co-wrote for the project. In 2019 he started and hosted the Acoustic Storytime as a monthly radio show for Sirius XM's The Message that features songs, stories, and conversations with other Christian musicians. He also released the first of three EPs, Order, in 2019, followed by Disorder and Reorder which were eventually repackaged as a full-length album, Order Disorder Reorder in 2020.

Charity
Gray was honored as one of "Ten Outstanding Young Minnesotans" in 2003 by the Minnesota Junior Chamber for his volunteerism, civic leadership, and humanitarian work with World Vision's "Hope Initiative", which addresses the needs of children orphaned by AIDS in Africa and other third-world countries. Gray has been to Africa in 2003 and 2006, and is known for his advocacy of AIDS orphans. His passion for understanding service to the poor as a form of worship is expressed in his song "Fade With Our Voices" from his 2009 release Everything Sad Is Coming Untrue. In 2010, Gray concluded the World Vision-sponsored tour "Make a Difference Tour 2010" with Third Day, Toby Mac, Michael W. Smith and Max Lucado.

Personal life
Jason Gray was born and raised in southern Minnesota. He grew up on the road with his mother who used to make her living by performing in bar bands. As disagreements between his parents led to a bitter divorce and custody battle when Gray was just six, he developed a speech impediment known as stuttering. His mother remarried, but his stepfather became increasingly abusive after her conversion to Christianity when Gray was a fourth grader. Her conversion at a Brian Rudd revival meeting led her to go from being in a bar band to singing at revival meetings "literally overnight". In 1989 Gray's mother and stepfather were divorced and he and his mother relocated to the Mankato, Minnesota area where Gray would live for the next 26 years, working first as a youth pastor and eventually growing an audience for his unique brand of songwriting and storytelling.

He was married to Taya and has three sons. Gray's album Christmas Stories: Repeat The Sounding Joy features Gray's two older boys providing background vocals and hand-claps, while Gray's youngest son takes the lead vocal on the song "Christmas for Jesus". Due to irreconcilable differences, Gray divorced in January 2015.

Discography

Studio albums

As Jason Gay
 The Singer & the Song (1997, independent)
 A Place Called Hope (2001, independent)
 The Better Part of Me (2005, independent) [Eight tracks were re-released with an altered track listingin 2007 as All the Lovely Losers]

As Jason Gray

Other albums and EPs

Singles

Appearances on other compilations
2007: "Mary Did You Know, Miriam" on compilation album Bethlehem Skyline
2010: "Love Has a Name" and "Do You Hear What I Hear" on compilation album Bethlehem Skyline Volume 2

References

External links
 
 Centricity Music: Jason Gray page

1972 births
American performers of Christian music
Centricity Music artists
Musicians from Minneapolis
American male singer-songwriters
Living people
Singer-songwriters from Minnesota
21st-century American singers
21st-century American male singers